George Sergienko Jr. (May 22, 1918 – December 4, 1993) was an American football tackle.

Sergienko was born in Chicopee, Massachusetts in 1918 and attended Chicopee High School. He played college football at American International College.

He played professional football as a tackle in the National Football League for the Brooklyn Dodgers (NFL) in 1943, the Brooklyn Tigers in 1944, and the Boston Yanks in 1945, and in the All-America Football Conference for the Brooklyn Dodgers in 1946. He appeared in a total of 37 professional football games, 24 of them as a starter. 

He died in 1993 in Springfield, Massachusetts.

References

1918 births
1993 deaths
American football tackles
Brooklyn Dodgers (NFL) players
Brooklyn Tigers players
Brooklyn Dodgers (AAFC) players
Boston Yanks players
Players of American football from Massachusetts